Stephanus Ackermann (born December 26, 1985) is a Namibian cricketer. He is a right-handed batsman and a right-arm medium-pace bowler. He was born in Windhoek and has played one-day cricket for the Namibian youth team since 2005. He played in the Under-19 World Cup for Namibia in 2006.

Ackermann is generally used as a lower-middle order batsman, but has not been much used by his team in their bowling attack. Ackermann made an appearance for the Namibia A team in October 2007, his first appearance for the Namibians since the Youth World Cup.

Ackermann made his first-class debut in October 2008, against North West.

External links 
Stephanus Ackermann at CricketArchive 

1985 births
Cricketers from Windhoek
Namibian cricket captains
Living people
Namibian cricketers